The 1990 Shreveport mayoral election resulted in the election of Republican councilwoman Hazel Beard in the race to succeed the term limited incumbent, John Brennan Hussey. The primary election was held on October 6, 1990. Beard and C. O. Simpkins, a dentist and civil rights activist, advanced to the general election held on November 6, 1994. Beard became the first woman, and the first Republican since Reconstruction, to serve as mayor of Shreveport.

Results

|}

|}

References

Shreveport
Government of Shreveport, Louisiana
1990 Louisiana elections
November 1990 events in the United States